Tomaž Gantar (born 21 March 1960) is a Slovenian politician. He was the Minister of Health in Slovenia from 13 March 2020 to 18 December 2020 in the 14th Government of Slovenia. He was also the temporary representative of The Democratic Party of Pensioners of Slovenia from September to December 2020.

References 

Living people
1960 births
Place of birth missing (living people)
Health ministers of Slovenia
21st-century Slovenian politicians